"Sobri (Notre Destin)" is the first single from French singer Leslie's album, Mes Couleurs.  The song was produced by Kore & Skalp, who produce tracks in the Raï style of music. The single was a great success in France and Belgium (Wallonia) where it almost topped the chart. As of August 2014, il was the 76th best-selling single of the 21st century in France, with 342,000 units sold.

The song was covered by Amine in 2006 for his album Au delà des rêves, on which it features as 13th in a remix club version.

Track listing
 CD single
 "Sobri (notre destin)" featuring Amine (radio edit) — 3:32
 "Le Temps qui passe" — 3:31
 "Sobri (notre destin)" featuring Amine (extended version) — 4:12

Charts

Weekly weeks

Year-end charts

References

2005 singles
Amine (singer) songs
Leslie (singer) songs
Male–female vocal duets
Songs written by Leslie (singer)
Songs written by Skalp
Songs written by Kore (producer)